Loron may refer to:
 Tenbo/Loron people
 Clodronic acid, as per trade name